David Begg (born 7 March 1950) is a former General Secretary of the main Irish organised labour body, the Irish Congress of Trade Unions, between 2001 and 2015, and later CEO of major development charity Concern Worldwide. In 2021, he was appointed as chairperson of the Workplace Relations Commission for five years by Damien English.

He has also been a director of Ireland's Central Bank (1995–2010), a governor of the Irish Times Trust (2001–2011), a non-executive director of Aer Lingus, a member of the National Economic and Social Council (NESC), and of the Advisory Board of Development Co-operation Ireland.

Early Life
Begg was born in north Dublin. He worked in the ESB and became active in the trade union movement.

Education
Begg holds master's degree in International Relations from DCU and a PhD in Sociology from Maynooth University. He is an Adjunct Professor at Maynooth University Institute of Social Sciences (MUSSI).

Controversies
After the Jobstown Protest in November 2014, which saw a sit-down protest occur in front of Tánaiste Joan Burton's car, David Begg stated that he believed that Burton's assistant, Labour Party official Karen O'Connell, was beaten and kicked. Some protestors were subsequently taken to court for false imprisonment but acquitted and subsequently charges were dropped against the remaining protestors.

On 13 January 2016 the same Tánaiste, Joan Burton, in her role as Social Protection Minister, appointed Mr Begg as chair of the Pension Authority.

Book
Begg's study of Northern European open economies, Lost in Transition, was published internationally by Palgrave Macmillan in February 2016.

References

Alumni of Dublin City University
Alumni of St Patrick's College, Maynooth
Irish trade union leaders
Living people
Place of birth missing (living people)
Year of birth missing (living people)